Bắc Sơn may refer to:

Places in Vietnam

Bắc Sơn District, a rural district of Lạng Sơn Province
, a ward of Kiến An District in Haiphong city
, a ward of Tam Điệp city
, a ward of Uông Bí city in Quảng Ninh Province
, a ward of Sầm Sơn city in Thanh Hóa Province
, a ward of Phổ Yên town
, a ward of Bỉm Sơn town in Thanh Hóa Province
Bắc Sơn (township), a township and capital of Bắc Sơn District
, a rural commune of Sóc Sơn District
, a rural commune of An Dương District
, a rural commune of Móng Cái city in Quảng Ninh Province
, a rural commune of Trảng Bom District
, a rural commune of Ân Thi District
, a rural commune of Đô Lương District in Nghệ An Province
, a rural commune of Quỳ Hợp District in Nghệ An Province
, a rural commune of Thuận Bắc District
, a rural commune of Tam Nông District
, a rural commune of Hưng Hà District

Other uses
Bắc Sơn culture
"Bắc Sơn", a song written by Văn Cao

See also
北山 (disambiguation)